Saturnino Blanco Nardo (c. 1790– ?) was an Argentine military man and politician, who served as congressman and commander of Yaguareté Corá (Corrientes, Argentina).

Biography 

He was born in Corrientes, Argentina, belonging to a Creole family of Asturian ancestry. He took an active part in the civil-military conflicts, serving under the orders of the General Francisco Ramírez against José Gervasio Artigas. In 1821, he served as a congressman for Yaguareté Corá in Corrientes Province. That same year he was promoted to the rank of captain, serving as commander-in-chief of the towns of San Miguel and Yatebú.

References 

Argentine people of Spanish descent
Argentine people of Asturian descent
Argentine Army officers
Federales (Argentina)
Río de la Plata